Soso Matiashvili (born 27 January 1993) is a Georgian rugby union player. His position is wing, and he currently plays for Lelo Saracens in the Georgia Championship and the Georgia national team. He was named in Georgia's squad for the 2017 summer test series against the United States, Canada and Argentina.

References

1993 births
Living people
Rugby union players from Georgia (country)
Georgia international rugby union players
The Black Lion players
Rugby union fullbacks